Tantallognathus is an extinct genus of four-limbed vertebrate ("tetrapod") from the Mississippian of Scotland. It is based on a small jaw fragment which shows similarities to Crassigyrinus, baphetids, and crown group tetrapods. This fossil was found near Tantallon Castle (namesake of the genus), and the species name honors famed Scottish fossil collector Stan Wood. Tantallognathus is one of the most advanced tetrapods found in the Ballagan Formation, a geological unit known for a diverse fauna of stegocephalians. Like other Ballagan Formation vertebrates, it helps to clarify a pulse of tetrapod evolution during Romer's gap, a time interval when fossils of tetrapods and their relatives are otherwise very rare.

References 

Carboniferous tetrapods of Europe
Mississippian animals
Prehistoric tetrapod genera

Fossil taxa described in 2018
Stegocephalians